António Macedo is a fine artist who studied at the Escola Superior de Belas Artes do Porto (Oporto School of Fine Arts). His work clearly reflects the Anglo-Saxon culture due to the years spent in London and other parts of the United Kingdom.sdv He works mainly as a painter and sculptor, with a definite realist style, and he is also known as a portrait painter.

Oil Painting is his medium of choice, and his subjects, other than portraits, include the feminine figure, draperies, still-life, symbolic and magic realism, as well as scenes from ordinary life.

Amongst his numerous portraits are those of the President of the Portuguese Parliament, Dr. António Almeida Santos, the Bishops of Oporto  D. Armindo Coelho and D. Manuel Clemente and those at the Constitutional Court, Dr Artur Maurício and Dr Luis Nunes de Almeida. Paintins of his can be seen in several institutions, both public and private and he has exhibited both  on his own and collectively, national and internationally. His works are referred to and illustrated in numerous publications, specially those  published by Galeria Cordeiros  and their associates.

Highlights:

First Prize (Stanley Grimm) at the Royal Institute of Oil Painters exhibition, in 1989

Honorable mention at the Placência Bienal Exhibition in 1999

Member of Sociedade Nacional de Belas Artes

Member of Cooperativa Árvore

Referred to in: Dicionário de Pintores e Escultores Portugueses de Dr. Fernando de Pamplona

Academic Qualifications
António Macedo obtained a Bachelor of Arts degree with the Open University In the United Kingdom, and before that, he attended Art School in Oporto (Escola Superior de Belas Artes do Porto).

Professional Training 

In 1975 he moved to London, and later on to Tunbridge Wells, where after training with a local picture restorer, he became technical consultant to the Pantiles Gallery, in that town. His work as a painter was then promoted by John Whiteley Ltd, in London and later on by W.H. Patterson Gallery in Albemarle Street, London.

Having had training in sculpture at Art School, he has produced pieces of sculpture from 1986 onwards.

His ever-present interest in painting materials and techniques developed through the close study of works from the past, the conservation work done in collaboration with picture restorers, through the production of copies and works inspired in the great periods of picture making.

Career

1969-73: A.M. discovers a passion for Drawing and Painting and develops his skills in this area, through contacts with fellow students and established artists but mainly through  his own efforts.

1973-74: He attends the local Art School (Escola Superior de Belas Artes do Porto) in the courses of Painting  and Sculpture which were taught simultaneously in the first years of a student’s degree.

1975: Unsatisfied with the teaching methods at Art School, he travels to London where he takes up residence, and where he continues his research in the painting methods of the past and makes some contacts amongst practicing artists of the day. Two painters were of great help in this period: Daniel Samuels, and Harold Hitchcock. His work starts to be promoted by John Whiteley Ltd in London.

1977: He moves from London to Tunbridge Wells, Kent, where he starts his apprenticeship in oil painting conservation techniques with local picture restorers.

1978: He  becomes part of a small group of artists  whose work is promoted by the Pantiles Gallery, in Tunbridge Wells, Kent.

1979: He exhibits at the Royal Academy Summer Exhibition, at Burlington House, Piccadilly

1982: He exhibits at a collective show at the Gillridge Gallery in Mayfield, East Sussex.

1983: First one-man show at the Fundação Engenheiro António de Almeida, Oporto

1984: Second exhibition at the Fundação Engenheiro António de Almeida, Oporto.  He  participates in several collective shows both in Portugal and in the U.K. and his work is then sold and  promoted by W.H. Patterson Gallery, London.

1986: One-man show at the Galeria do Museu Municipal de Aveiro. He also completes his BA degree with the Open University in the U.K. He starts producing pieces of sculpture as well as paintings (including portraits ) from this time onwards. (e.g. portrait bust of his father).

1987: His work is promoted and sold  through Christopher Wood Gallery (London). He participates in several collective exhibitions In Portugal, Japan, France and the U.K.1988: One-man show, again at the Fundação Engenheiro António de Almeida, Oporto
1989: He is invited to have a one-man show in Santa Maria da Feira’s Town Hall. He has work in several collective shows too, and wins the first prize (Stanley Grimm) at the exhibition of the Royal Institute of Oil Painters (Mall Galleries, London)

1991/92/93/94: He participates in several collective exhibitions in Portugal, Germany and the U.K.

1995: One-man show at Galeria Narareth (Oporto). One-man show at Galeria Euroarte (Lisbon) and a number of other collective exhibitions

1996: One-man show at the Fundação António Cupertino de Miranda (Oporto). He also participates in a collective show at Galeria Mellado (S. Lorenzo del Escorial-Madrid, Spain)

1997: He participates for the first time in the "Mestres de Pintura" collective shows at Galeria Cordeiros (Oporto).1998: His work starts being sold and promoted in Portugal by Galeria Cordeiros (Oporto); first one-man show at Galeria Cordeiros, and other collective shows, namely the Vila Nova de Cerveira bienal exhibition. Honorable mention at the Bienal de Arte de Placência (Spain).
2000: One-man exhibition in Coimbra, at the " Sala da Cidade", and other collective shows in Portugal

2001: One-man show at Galeria Cordeiros (Oporto) and other collective Exhibitions

2002/03: He participates in several collective exhibitions organised by Galeria Cordeiros

2004: One-man exhibition at Galeria Cordeiros, and several collective shows organized by the Gallery

2005, 2006, 2007: He participates in a number of collective exhibitions organized by Galeria Cordeiros2008: Art Madrid, Arte moderna e contemporânea, exposição colectiva de pintura e escultura (Galeria Cordeiros)
2009: One-man show at Galeria Cordeiros, and several collective exhibitions such as Madrid Art Fair, Fiart Valência, arte moderna e contemporânea

2010: He participates in a number of Art Fairs with Galeria Cordeiros: Art Madrid, Museu da Alfândega, Oporto, Colectiva de pintura, VI Contemporary Art Fair – Marbella, Centro de Congressos do Estoril

2011: He participates in a number of Art Fairs and collective exhibitions: Art Madrid, Art Moscow, Art Toronto, Contemporary Istanbul, and other exhibitions organized by Galeria Cordeiros

2013: He participates in Figurativas 13, Fundació de les Arts i els Artistes (MEAM- Barcelona), Art Monaco, Zona Maco (Mexico), India Art Fair (New Delhi), Art Stage (Singapore), Colectiva de pintura, Galeria Cordeiros

2014: Collective exhibitions and Art fairs: Silicon Valley Contemporary, San Jose, California (Galeria Cordeiros)

2015: " Una otra realidad" Collective exhibition by Fundación Arcilla in the Centro Cultural La Vaguada, Madrid, and other exhibitions organized by Galeria Cordeiros (Cordoaria-Lisbon, Art Miami, USA)

References 
[1], Official biography

Sources

 de Pamplona, Fernando (1987). [2]Dicionário de pintores e escultores portugueses ou que trabalharam em Portugal (in Portuguese). Porto, Portugal: Livraria Civilização Editora. .
 António de Macedo – Book published by BIAL – 1989
 Aspectos das Artes Plásticas em Portugal, Book published by Fernando Infante do Carmo, 1992
 António de Macedo –- Documentary film by Adriano Nazareth, first shown in RTP 1 television channel in July 1993
 1995/96 – Anuário das Artes Plásticas . Estar Editora
 Mestres da Pintura – 21 November-1 December 1996 (catalogue)
 Mestres da Pintura – 8–18 May 1997 (catalogue)
 Exposição da Pintura – Cruz vermelha Portuguesa, Expo’98 (catalogue)
 Mestres da Pintura – 7–17 May 1998 (catalogue)
 António Macedo – 5–16 November 1998 (catalogue)
 Mestres da Pintura – 19–29 November 1998 (catalogue)
 Mestres da Pintura – 6–16 May 1999 (catalogue)
 Mestres da Pintura – 18–28 November 1999 (catalogue)
 António Macedo – Book published by BIAL – 1999
 António Macedo – Sala da Cidade – 20 January – 16 February 2000 (catalogue)
 Mestres da Pintura – 18–28 May 2000 (catalogue)
 Mestres da Pintura – 16–26 November 2000 (catalogue)
 Cordeiros Gallery Catalogue (2001). António Macedo. 
 Mestres da Pintura – Cordeiros 2002 (catalogue)
 Cordeiros 2002 – Arte Contemporânea- Centro de Congressos do Estoril (catalogue)
 Cordeiros 2003 – Exposição Mestres da Pintura (catalogue)
 António Macedo – Exposição – 2004 (catalogue)
 Cordeiros 2004 – Exposição Mestres da Pintura (catalogue)
 Perante os olhos, a vida real – Exposição evocativa da abertura do Auditório Prof. Doutor Alexandre Moreira, Hospital de Santo António, Porto (catalogue)
 Mestres da Pintura – 2005 – Galeria Cordeiros (catalogue)
 Cordeiros 2007 – Arte Moderna e Contemporânea (catalogue)
 Cordeiros 2008/2009 – Arte Moderna e Contemporânea (catalogue)
 António Macedo – Extensive catalogue  produced by Galeria Cordeiros in collaboration with Casino da Póvoa - 2009
 60 years, 60 artists- Modern and Contemporary Art – The National Culture Art and Museum Complex – Mystetskyi Arsenal, Kyiv, Ukrain  - 2011 (catalogue)
 Cordeiros – Arte Moderna e Contemporânea – 2010-2011 (catalogue)
 Viver Academia Militar – Edições Especiais Lda, academia Militar . 2012
 Figurativas 13 – 7º concurso de pintura y escultura, Fundació de les Arts i els Artistes (catalogue)

External links
Official website (English language version)
Galeria Cordeiros (Portuguese)

1955 births
Living people
Realist artists
Portuguese painters
Portuguese male painters
Contemporary painters
Artists from Porto
University of Porto alumni